Botany Bay is a bay in New South Wales, Australia.

It may also refer to:

Places:
 Botany Bay (Chorley), a community in the North West of England
 Botany Bay, Derbyshire, a small hamlet in South Derbyshire, England
 Botany Bay, Kent, a bay in Broadstairs, Kent, England
 Botany Bay, London, a village in the London Borough of Enfield, England
 Botany Bay, Monmouthshire, an area in the Wye Valley, Wales
 Botany Bay Plantation Wildlife Management Area, a state preserve on Edisto Island, South Carolina, United States
 City of Botany Bay, the local government area in New South Wales
 Botany Bay, Trinity Peninsula, a bay on Trinity Peninsula, Antarctica
 Botany Bay, Victoria Land, a bay in Victoria Land, Antarctica
 Botany Bay, former name of an area of Henbury, Bristol, United Kingdom
 Botany Bay, a residential quadrangle in Trinity College, Dublin.
 Botany Bay, a residential area and preserve at St. Thomas, United States Virgin Islands

In entertainment:
 Botany Bay, a 1941 novel by Charles Nordhoff and James Norman Hall
 "Botany Bay" (song), a folk song recorded by Rolf Harris among others
 Botany Bay (film), a 1953 film starring Alan Ladd
 SS Botany Bay, a spaceship in the fictional Star Trek universe
 Botany Bay, a fictional planet in the novel Friday (novel) by Robert A. Heinlein
 Botany Bay, a fishing boat used for illegal whale-harpooning in the movie Free Willy 3 The Rescue.
 Jim Jones at Botany Bay, a folk song recorded by Bob Dylan among others

See also:
 Botany Bay National Park, a national park in New South Wales, Australia
 Chrysolopus spectabilis, a species of weevil found in south-eastern Australia, commonly known as the Botany Bay diamond weevil
 Port Botany, New South Wales, a suburb located to the north of Botany Bay, New South Wales, Australia
 Port Botany (seaport), a seaport located on the shore of Botany Bay, New South Wales, Australia